is a manga by Osamu Tezuka that began serialization in 1946.

Plot
Diary of Mā-chan is a collection of 4-panel comic strips (yonkoma) about the everyday adventures of a small pre-school boy named Mā-chan.  The manga consists of 73 strips.

Characters
Mā-chan:  A mischievous little pre-school boy growing up immediately after World War II.
Ton-chan:  Ma-chan's friend.
University-age boy
Father:  Ma-chan's father.
Mother:  Ma-chan's mother.
Teacher:  Ma-chan's pre-school teacher.

First work by Tezuka
Diary of Mā-chan is very important as it was Tezuka's first professional work to be published. When Tezuka drew it in 1945, he was only 17 years old.  While the drawings were crude compared to his later art work, many elements of his art style first became visible in this comic strip. Diary of Mā-chan was so popular that Mā-chan dolls were produced, the first of many Tezuka merchandise products.

See also
List of Osamu Tezuka manga
Osamu Tezuka's Star System

References

External links
Diary of Ma-chan manga page at TezukaOsamu@World (archived)

Osamu Tezuka manga
1946 manga
Yonkoma
Children's manga